Valentina Mikhaylovna Lituyeva (11 February 1930 – 4 April 2008) was a Soviet track and field athlete who competed in the long jump.

Born Valentina Bogdanova in Leningrad, she joined local club Burevestnik Leningrad and ranked within the top ten in the world for the first time in 1949, having jumped a best of  that year.

Lituyeva missed the 1951 season but returned for the 1952 Summer Olympics and managed to place eleventh in the final. Her next international appearance was at the 1955 World Festival of Youth and Students. She won a bronze medal and the level of competition was high, with Galina Vinogradova taking the title with one of the best jumps that year. Lituyeva cleared six metres for the first time with a jump of  that November.

Lituyeva returned to try to regain her long jump title at the 1958 European Athletics Championships, but came up short behind West German athlete Liesel Jakobi and ended up with the silver medal. That was the last major competition that she competed in.

International competitions

See also
List of European Athletics Championships medalists (women)

References

External links 
 

1930 births
2008 deaths
Soviet female long jumpers
Russian female long jumpers
Olympic athletes of the Soviet Union
Athletes (track and field) at the 1952 Summer Olympics
European Athletics Championships medalists